Chao is an album by pianist Paul Bley , bassist Furio Di Castri and drummer Tony Oxley, recorded in Italy in 1994 and released on the Soul Note label in 1998.

Reception 

AllMusic stated: "This set of concise free improvisations is highly recommended to open-minded listeners".

All About Jazz wrote: "There are plenty of interesting harmonies here, and a sense of rhythm which both includes and goes beyond the tyranny of the beat. Fans of Paul Bley or post-bop music in general will have a treat with this beautifully produced recording". Another review on the same site stated: "Bley and company have churned out a very interesting collection of tunes that stretch the imagination and boundaries of jazz".

Track listing
All compositions by Paul Bley except as indicated
 "Chaos"	- 4:53
 "Touching Bass" (Furio Di Castri) - 3:47
 "Modulating" (Tony Oxley) - 4:37
 " Soft Touch" (Bley, Oxley) - 5:58
 "Poetic Justice" - 6:36
 "Interpercussion 1" (Oxley) - 1:51
 "Touch Control" - 3:22
 "Turnham Bey" - 4:58
 "Street Wise" - 6:07
 "Bow Out" (Oxley)	- 4:20
 "Starting Over" - 5:16
 "Interpercussion 2" (Oxley) - 3:34
 "Template" - 4:00

Personnel 
Paul Bley - piano
Furio Di Castri - bass 
Tony Oxley - drums

References 

1998 albums
Paul Bley albums
Black Saint/Soul Note albums